Jacek Pszczoła (born January 10, 1967) is an American professional bridge player of Polish origin. Representing Poland, Pszczoła won the 1998 World Open Pairs Championship with Michał Kwiecień.  American bridge players often refer to him by the nickname "Pepsi". He was Player of the Year of the ACBL in 2019.

Bridge accomplishments

Wins

 World Open Pairs (1) 1998
 Bermuda Bowl (1) 2017
 North American Bridge Championships (5)
 Life Master Open Pairs (1) 2001
 Jacoby Open Swiss Teams (1) 2004
 Vanderbilt Knockout Teams (1) 2001
 Spingold Knockout Teams (1) 2019
 Reisinger Board-a-Match Teams (1) 2006
 Rockwell Trophy Rockwell_Mixed_Pairs (with May Sakr) 2022
 Other notable wins:
 Buffett Cup (1) 2008
 Cavendish Invitational Teams (1) 2009
 Cavendish Invitational Pairs (2) 2001, 2004
 NEC Cup Bridge Festival (1) 2001

Runners-up
 World Open Team Olympiad (1) 2000
 North American Bridge Championships (5)
 Open Board-a-Match Teams (3) 2000, 2003, 2005
 Reisinger Board-a-Match Teams (1) 2019
 Vanderbilt Knockout Teams (1) 2002
 European Championships (1)
 Open Teams (1) 1997
 Other notable 2nd places:
 IOC Grand Prix (1) 2002

References

External links
 
 

1967 births
Polish contract bridge players
American contract bridge players
Living people
Place of birth missing (living people)